Jhonny J. Núñez (born November 26, 1985) is a Dominican former professional baseball pitcher.

Career
He pitched in the rookie-level Gulf Coast League for the GCL Dodgers, where he accrued a win-loss record of 6-0 and an ERA of 1.58 in 7 starts and 3 relief appearances; he struck out 56 batters in 57 innings. The Los Angeles organization recognized Núñez as their top minor league pitcher for the month of July. On August 31, 2006, he was acquired by the Washington Nationals for veteran utility player Marlon Anderson.

In , Núñez pitched for the Hagerstown Suns of the Low-A South Atlantic League. He logged 105⅔ innings in 22 starts and one relief appearance, winning 4, losing 6, and recording a 4.05 ERA.

In , Núñez pitched for the High-A Potomac Nationals and Double-A Harrisburg Senators, converting to relief. On July 31, 2008, Núñez was traded to the New York Yankees for infielder Alberto Gonzalez and joined the Yankees Double-A affiliate, the Trenton Thunder.

On November 13, 2008, Núñez was traded along with Wilson Betemit and Jeffrey Marquez to the Chicago White Sox for Nick Swisher and Kanekoa Texeira.  He made his major league debut for the White Sox on August 2, 2009, at U.S. Cellular Field. Nunez retired the Yankee's Johnny Damon, the only batter he faced, on a ground ball to shortstop.

The Tampa Bay Rays signed him to a minor league contract on December 1, 2011.

Núñez was granted free agency after the 2012 season with the Tampa Bay Rays and signed with Seattle Mariners on a minor league contract for the 2013 season with an invite for spring training.

Pitching style
Núñez is a fastball/slider pitcher with a 94-mph fastball that can reach 97 MPH. He also has a hard sinker. He has a three-quarters arm slot and can throw a changeup, but it's apparently a secondary pitch.

Personal
During the offseason, Núñez lives in San Jose de las Matas, Dominican Republic.  Also During the offseason Jhonny pitches in the Dominican Winter League LIDOM for The Gigantes del Cibao.

References

External links

1985 births
Living people
Birmingham Barons players
Bristol White Sox players
Charlotte Knights players
Chicago White Sox players
Dominican Republic expatriate baseball players in Mexico
Dominican Republic expatriate baseball players in the United States
Durham Bulls players
Gulf Coast Dodgers players
Hagerstown Suns players
Harrisburg Senators players

Major League Baseball pitchers
Major League Baseball players from the Dominican Republic
Mexican League baseball pitchers
Potomac Nationals players
Tacoma Rainiers players
Trenton Thunder players
Vaqueros Laguna players